

Crown
Head of State - Queen Elizabeth II

Federal government
Governor General - Adrienne Clarkson

Cabinet
Prime Minister -  Jean Chrétien then Paul Martin
Deputy Prime Minister - John Manley then Anne McLellan
Minister of Finance - John Manley then Ralph Goodale
Minister of Foreign Affairs - Bill Graham
Minister of National Defence - John McCallum then David Pratt
Minister of Health - Anne McLellan then Pierre Pettigrew
Minister of Industry - Allan Rock then Lucienne Robillard
Minister of Heritage - Sheila Copps then Hélène Scherrer
Minister of Intergovernmental Affairs - Stéphane Dion then Pierre Pettigrew
Minister of the Environment - David Anderson
Minister of Justice - Martin Cauchon then Irwin Cotler
Minister of Transport - David Collenette then Tony Valeri
Minister of Citizenship and Immigration - Denis Coderre then Judy Sgro
Minister of Fisheries and Oceans - Robert Thibault then Geoff Regan
Minister of Agriculture and Agri-Food - Lyle Vanclief then Bob Speller
Minister of Public Works and Government Services - Ralph Goodale then Stephen Owen
Minister of Human Resources Development - Jane Stewart (position discontinued on December 11)
Minister of Natural Resources - Herb Dhaliwal then John Efford
Minister of Human Resources and Skills Development - Joe Volpe (position created on December 12)
Minister of Social Development - Liza Frulla (position created on December 12)

Members of Parliament
See: 37th Canadian parliament

Party leaders
Liberal Party of Canada -  Jean Chrétien then Paul Martin
Canadian Alliance - Stephen Harper
Bloc Québécois - Gilles Duceppe
New Democratic Party- Alexa McDonough then Jack Layton
Progressive Conservative Party of Canada - Joe Clark then Peter MacKay

Supreme Court Justices
Chief Justice: Beverley McLachlin
Frank Iacobucci
John C. Major
Michel Bastarache
William Ian Corneil Binnie
Louise Arbour
Louis LeBel
Marie Deschamps
Charles D. Gonthier then Morris Fish

Other
Speaker of the House of Commons - Peter Milliken
Governor of the Bank of Canada - David Dodge
Chief of the Defence Staff - General R.R. Henault

Provinces

Premiers
Premier of Alberta - Ralph Klein
Premier of British Columbia - Gordon Campbell
Premier of Manitoba - Gary Doer
Premier of New Brunswick - Bernard Lord
Premier of Newfoundland and Labrador - Roger Grimes, then Danny Williams
Premier of Nova Scotia - John Hamm
Premier of Ontario - Ernie Eves, then Dalton McGuinty
Premier of Prince Edward Island - Pat Binns
Premier of Quebec - Bernard Landry, then Jean Charest
Premier of Saskatchewan - Lorne Calvert
Premier of the Northwest Territories - Stephen Kakfwi, then Joe Handley
Premier of Nunavut - Paul Okalik
Premier of Yukon - Dennis Fentie

Lieutenant-governors
Lieutenant-Governor of Alberta - Lois Hole
Lieutenant-Governor of British Columbia - Iona Campagnolo
Lieutenant-Governor of Manitoba - Peter Liba
Lieutenant-Governor of New Brunswick - Marilyn Trenholme Counsell then Herménégilde Chiasson
Lieutenant-Governor of Newfoundland and Labrador - Edward Roberts
Lieutenant-Governor of Nova Scotia - Myra Freeman
Lieutenant-Governor of Ontario - James Bartleman
Lieutenant-Governor of Prince Edward Island - Léonce Bernard
Lieutenant-Governor of Quebec - Lise Thibault
Lieutenant-Governor of Saskatchewan - Lynda Haverstock

Mayors
Toronto - Mel Lastman then David Miller
Montreal - Gérald Tremblay
Vancouver - Larry Campbell
Ottawa - Bob Chiarelli
Victoria - Alan Lowe

Religious leaders
Roman Catholic Bishop of Quebec -  Cardinal Archbishop Marc Ouellet
Roman Catholic Bishop of Montreal -  Cardinal Archbishop Jean-Claude Turcotte
Roman Catholic Bishops of London - Bishop Ronald Peter Fabbro
Moderator of the United Church of Canada - Marion Pardy then Peter Short

See also
2002 Canadian incumbents
Events in Canada in 2003
2004 Canadian incumbents
 Governmental leaders in 2003, Canadian incumbents by year

2003
Incumbents
Canadian incumbents
Canadian leaders